Nikolay Asenov Arabov (born 14 November 1953) is a Bulgarian former professional footballer and manager who played as a defender from 1971 to 1994, most notably for Sliven. 

Arabov was capped 42 times for the Bulgaria national football team and represented the nation at the 1986 FIFA World Cup.

Career
Arabov made his debut for Sliven in 1971 and stayed in the club for 15 years, with 310 games in the A PFG. Capped 42 times for the Bulgaria national football team in the period 1976 - 1986, including 3 games at 1986 FIFA World Cup in Mexico. Arabov has also played for Spartak Pleven, Lokomotiv Plovdiv, Anagennisi Dherynia and Albanian KF Tirana  before returning to Sliven for its last season in A PFG (1993). After his retirement as a player Arabov worked for many years in Albania, coaching KF Tirana, KF Partizani, and KS Flamurtari.

References

1953 births
Living people
Sportspeople from Sliven
Association football defenders
Bulgarian footballers
Bulgaria international footballers
1986 FIFA World Cup players
OFC Sliven 2000 players
PFC Spartak Pleven players
Anagennisi Deryneia FC players
PFC Lokomotiv Plovdiv players
KF Tirana players
Bulgarian expatriate footballers
Expatriate footballers in Cyprus
Bulgarian expatriate sportspeople in Cyprus
Expatriate footballers in Albania
Bulgarian expatriate sportspeople in Albania
Kategoria Superiore players
First Professional Football League (Bulgaria) players
Cypriot First Division players
Bulgarian football managers
FK Partizani Tirana managers
Flamurtari Vlorë managers
Bulgarian expatriate football managers
Expatriate football managers in Albania